Sue Roberts  is an English-Antipodean librarian.  After studying in the UK (BA (Hons), DipLib, MA) and working at Edge Hill University in Lancashire, she has held a series of library leadership roles in Australia and New Zealand, including a period as head of the State Library of Victoria. She currently lead the libraries at the University of Auckland.

Career
 Dean of Learning Services, Edge Hill University, Ormskirk, Lancashire
 University Librarian, Victoria University of Wellington 2007–2012
 CEO and State Librarian, Victoria State Library, Melbourne 2012–2015

 University Librarian, University of Auckland 2016–present

Selected works 
 Leadership: The Challenge for the Information Profession, with Jennifer Rowley. 2008. 
 Managing information services, with Jennifer Rowley. 2004. 
 Developing the new learning environment : the changing role of the academic librarian, with Philippa Levy. 2005. .

References

External links 
 https://twitter.com/suerobeleigh44

Living people
New Zealand librarians
Australian librarians
Australian women librarians
1970 births
Victoria University of Wellington
University of Auckland
Members of the Chartered Institute of Library and Information Professionals